The following are lists of the highest-grossing animated films of the 2000s.

Highest-grossing animated films of the 2000s
Figures are given in U.S. dollars (USD). DreamWorks Animation is the most represented animation studio with 14 films on the list and has the highest total of any animation studio in that decade. Distributors listed are for the original theatrical release.

Highest-grossing film by year 
DreamWorks Animation is the most represented studio with 4 films on this list. Ice Age is the most represented animated franchise with 3 films on this list.

See also
 List of animated feature films of the 2000s

Notes
Release Notes

References

2000s
 
Animated
Animated
Highest-grossing
Highest-grossing animated